Sampada Gramin Mahila Sanstha (SANGRAM) is a voluntary organization in India that was co-founded by activist Meena Seshu. It works at the grassroots level with activists, volunteers and paid workers. It is slowly gaining importance as a practical training ground for other NGOs and GOs interested in working on HIV/AIDS in a rural context. SANGRAM started its work with women in prostitution and sex work from South Maharashtra and North Karnataka in 1992, and has since fanned out among diverse populations. SANGRAM is based in Sangli district, which has the highest incidence of HIV/AIDS in Maharashtra after Mumbai.

References

External links
 SANGRAM website

HIV/AIDS organizations
Organisations based in Mumbai
Women's organisations based in India
Health charities in India
1992 establishments in Maharashtra
Organizations established in 1992